This article lists electoral firsts in Guernsey.

Women 
First female Deputy Chief Minister of Guernsey

 Heidi Soulsby

References 

Politics of Guernsey
Lists of firsts
United Kingdom politics-related lists